Arnold Alfred Gordon Sharp (30 June 1889 – 29 April 1967) was an Australian rules footballer who played for the St Kilda Football Club in the Victorian Football League (VFL).

Notes

External links 

1889 births
1967 deaths
Australian rules footballers from Tasmania
St Kilda Football Club players
Devonport Football Club players